The 2028 Summer Olympics, officially known as the Games of the XXXIV Olympiad, and commonly known as Los Angeles 2028 or LA28 is an upcoming international multi-sport event scheduled to take place from July 14 to July 30, 2028 in and around Los Angeles, California, United States. 

Los Angeles had originally bid for the 2024 Summer Olympics. However, after multiple withdrawals that left only Los Angeles and Paris in contention, the International Olympic Committee (IOC) approved a process to concurrently award the 2024 and 2028 Summer Olympics to the two remaining candidates, with Los Angeles preferred as the 2028 host. Los Angeles was formally awarded the Games at the 131st IOC Session in Lima, Peru, on September 13, 2017. They will mark the fifth Summer Olympics, and ninth Olympics overall, to be hosted by the United States. Having previously hosted the Summer Olympics in 1932 and 1984, Los Angeles will become the third three-time host city after London and Paris, and the first North American city ever to do so. 

The IOC has provisionally removed boxing, modern pentathlon, and weightlifting from the program of 28 "core" Olympic events, and has proposed to add skateboarding, sport climbing, and surfing — which were included in the programs of the 2020 and 2024 Games as optional sports. The organizing committee can additionally introduce new sports specifically for these Games as part of the IOC's 2020 agenda. Baseball/softball, cricket, lacrosse, flag football, and other sports are on the shortlist.

Bidding process

On September 16, 2015, the International Olympic Committee announced the candidature process and the five candidate cities for the 2024 Games: Budapest, Hamburg, Los Angeles, Paris, and Rome. Budapest, Hamburg, and Rome eventually withdrew, leaving only Los Angeles and Paris. A similar situation had already occurred during the bidding for the 2022 Winter Olympics when Krakow, Lviv, Oslo, and Stockholm withdrew, resulting in a two-way decision between Beijing, China, and Almaty, Kazakhstan, with Beijing ultimately declared the winner. On April 3, 2017, at the IOC convention in Denmark, Olympic officials met with bid committees from Los Angeles and Paris to discuss the possibility of naming two winners in the competition to host the 2024 Summer Games.

After these withdrawals, the IOC Executive Board met in Lausanne, Switzerland, on June 9, 2017, to discuss the 2024 and 2028 bid processes. The IOC formally proposed electing the 2024 and 2028 host cities at the same time in 2017, a proposal that an Extraordinary IOC Session approved on July 11, 2017, in Lausanne. The IOC set up a process where the Los Angeles and Paris 2024 bid committees and the IOC, held meetings in July 2017 to decide which city would host in each of the two years.

Following the decision to award the 2024 and 2028 Games simultaneously, Paris was understood to be preferred for the 2024 Games. On July 31, 2017, the IOC announced Los Angeles as the sole candidate for 2028, with $1.8 billion of additional funding from the IOC, allowing Paris to be confirmed as the host for 2024. On August 11, 2017, Los Angeles City Council voted unanimously to approve the bid. On September 11, 2017, Los Angeles received formal approval from the IOC's evaluation commission. On September 13, 2017, Los Angeles was formally awarded the 2028 Games following a unanimous vote by the IOC. The IOC praised the LA bid for using a record-breaking number of existing and temporary facilities and for relying entirely on corporate funding.

On October 16, 2017, Los Angeles 2028 received official support from the state of California. On August 29, 2018, Olympic officials arrived for a two-day visit that included meetings with local organizers and a tour of the city's newest venues. LMU and LA Times polls suggest that more than 88% of Angelenos are in favor of the city's hosting the 2028 Olympic and Paralympic Games.

Development and preparations

Venue construction and renovations

While most host cities have between six and seven years to prepare for the Olympic Games, Los Angeles will get an additional four, giving the city eleven years. The Los Angeles bid relied on a majority of existing venues; other venues that are already under construction or were planned regardless of the Games. BMO Stadium, which opened in 2018 as the home of Major League Soccer's Los Angeles FC, will host football (soccer) and several events in athletics. SoFi Stadium, which opened in 2020 as the home of the NFL's Los Angeles Rams and Los Angeles Chargers, will host the main opening ceremony, football, and archery. 

The Los Angeles Memorial Coliseum underwent a major renovation and restoration program from 2017 to 2019. A new press box, loge boxes, and club seats were installed. This reduced stadium capacity from 93,607 to 78,467. As the athletics venue, future renovations include the re-installation of an athletics track.

The Los Angeles Clippers are building a new basketball arena in Inglewood near SoFi Stadium, called Intuit Dome, which began construction in September 2021 and is expected to be completed in 2024. Team owner Steve Ballmer stated during its groundbreaking that he hoped that it could be included in the Games.

The Crypto.com Arena will undergo renovations which will be completed by 2024, four years prior to when the arena hosts the Olympic basketball competition.

Infrastructure

The Twenty-eight by '28 initiative is an effort set forth by Mayor Eric Garcetti that the Los Angeles County Metropolitan Transportation Authority complete 28 transit infrastructure projects before the start of the Games. Most of these projects were already in the planning stages during the bid, but will receive accelerated priority, while several minor new projects were programmed with the initiative.

The K Line opened to revenue service on October 7, 2022 after multiple delays from a planned opening in 2019. It links the Crenshaw District, Inglewood and Westchester. The K Line will also connect to a people mover being constructed since early 2018 to link Los Angeles International Airport with the Aviation/96th Street station, with opening anticipated in 2023. The Inglewood Transit Connector is another people mover planned to provide transportation between the K line and the Olympic venues in Inglewood.

While various infrastructure improvements were planned regardless of the outcome of the Los Angeles Olympic bid, the extension of the Metro D Line will be expedited to serve the Olympics. Three phases were created to extend the line. The first phase will extend the D Line from the Wilshire/Western station to the new Wilshire/La Cienega station. This phase will be completed by 2023. The second phase will extend the D Line to Century City by 2025, while the third and final phase will extend the line to the West Los Angeles VA Medical Center in Westwood with a completion date set for 2026. The third phase will also include a station adjoining the UCLA campus, connecting Olympic village and Pauley Pavilion with venues in downtown Los Angeles. Currently phase one, two and three broke ground and are under construction. Construction began in 2019 and remains on schedule.

The Regional Connector in downtown Los Angeles will be complete in 2023. The project will connect the Metro E Line, which already links venues in Downtown Santa Monica to venues at Exposition Park and in downtown Los Angeles, to the Metro L Line. This will allow for direct rail service between Santa Monica and East Los Angeles. The Regional Connector will also link the Metro A Line with the Metro L Line, connecting the Long Beach area and San Gabriel Valley via downtown.

These infrastructure improvements, among others, are being funded by "Measure R", a temporary half-cent sales tax increase, and "Measure M", a continuation of Measure R's tax increase plus an additional permanent half-cent sales tax increase, both tax measures applicable to Los Angeles County. Measure R was approved by voters in November 2008 and Measure M was approved by voters in November 2016.

Budget
In April 2019, the estimated cost of the Games was assessed as being approximately $6.88 billion with all the money coming from the private sector, although the Los Angeles city council and state of California legislators have agreed to serve as a "financial backstop." The organizers adjusted the budget for inflation after LA, which originally bid for the 2024 Games, agreed to wait four more years.

The City of Los Angeles is the lead public guarantor, committing to spend up to $250 million to cover shortfalls. In 2016, the California legislature took action so that the Governor is empowered to negotiate the next $250 million in public backup, but only after the city backup money has been used first. LA 2024 also agreed to purchase a wide range of insurance policies, including natural disaster, terrorism, event cancellation, as well as reduced ticket sales. The games are expected to generate as much as they cost, with $2.5 billion coming in through sponsorships and nearly $2 billion earned through ticket sales. Average ticket prices for the games will range between $13 and $457 (in 2016 dollars).

The federal government will designate the Olympics a National Special Security Event (NSSE) in which the US Secret Service heads a single chain of command. The US federal government will also cover the cost of security, with an agreement signed by the LA organizing committee and Department of Homeland Security in February 2020, but it will not be involved in the Games' funding, covering only the aforementioned security costs.

Venues
Under present IOC policy, venues with corporate naming rights will not be allowed to use their sponsored name during the Olympics.

Sports parks
There will be four "sports parks" throughout the city to host events at existing, temporary, and planned venues, as well as venues already under construction. The most prominent of the four locations will be the Downtown Sports Park, which will host events at various venues in Downtown Los Angeles. The Downtown Sports Park will host events including swimming, diving, football, badminton, road cycling, fencing, taekwondo and basketball at Los Angeles City Hall and Grand Park, the Los Angeles Convention Center, Crypto.com Arena, Los Angeles Memorial Coliseum, and the campus of the University of Southern California. In addition to sporting events, the Downtown Sports Park will also host the Main Press Center, Media Village, and Olympic Family Hotels, and serve as the venue for the Opening and Closing Ceremonies.

Additional sports parks include the Valley Sports Park, South Bay Sports Park, and the Long Beach Sports Park.

Downtown Sports Park
Various venues in Downtown Los Angeles.

Valley Sports Park

The Valley Sports Park host events at temporary venues in the Sepulveda Basin Recreation Center in the San Fernando Valley.

South Bay Sports Park

The South Bay Sports Park will be located on the campus of California State University, Dominguez Hills in Carson, California.

Long Beach Sports Park

The Long Beach Sports Park will host events along the Long Beach waterfront in Long Beach, California.

Westside
Various venues in the Westside of Los Angeles, CA.

Southern California venues
Various venues in the Greater Los Angeles area.

Potential football venues

According to the initial bid book for the Los Angeles 2024 Olympics, football venues are to be situated within Los Angeles Metropolitan Area and other main cities of California. The organizing committee's responsibility is to choose from four to six venues to host the tournament. According to the official website of the local organizing committee, eight venues are under consideration, all within California.

Potential venues in Los Angeles County
 Rose Bowl, Pasadena (92,542 capacity) – 3 group matches, quarterfinals, semifinals and women's final
 SoFi Stadium, Inglewood (72,000) – 3 group matches, quarterfinals, semifinals and men's final
 BMO Stadium, Exposition Park (22,000) – 8 group matches

Potential venues in the San Francisco Bay area
 Levi's Stadium, Santa Clara (68,500) – 5 group matches, quarterfinals, and men's bronze medal match
 California Memorial Stadium, Berkeley (63,000) – 8 group matches
 Stanford Stadium, Stanford (50,000) – 5 group matches, quarterfinals and women's bronze medal match
 PayPal Park, San Jose (20,000) – 8 group matches

Potential venues in San Diego County
 Snapdragon Stadium, San Diego (35,000) – 8 group matches

The Games

Sports

Under current IOC policies, the program of the Summer Olympics consists of 28 "core" sports that persist between Games, with other three to six slots able to be filled with backing of the IOC and organizing committee in order to improve local interest, provided that the total number of participants does not exceed 10,500 athletes.

On December 9, 2021, the IOC stated that boxing, modern pentathlon, and weightlifting had been removed from the "initial" program for the 2028 Summer Olympics, and would only be included if their respective governing bodies resolve issues raised by the IOC by 2023. In particular, the International Boxing Association (AIBA) has faced ongoing governance issues (which resulted in boxing at the 2020 Summer Olympics being overseen by an external task force), the International Weightlifting Federation has faced issues with doping and governance (resulting in weightlifting being considered "provisional" for the 2024 Summer Olympics), while the Union Internationale de Pentathlon Moderne (UIPM) must also finalize and seek approval for their proposed replacement of show jumping in the modern pentathlon. The UIPM tested obstacle course racing at an event in late-June 2022.

Additionally, the IOC executive board has proposed that skateboarding, sport climbing, and surfing be promoted to the core program of the 2028 Summer Olympics; the three sports successfully debuted as optional sports at the 2020 Summer Olympics, and are expected to return in the same capacity in 2024.

Optional sports
In August 2022, it was announced that nine sports had made the shortlist for inclusion in the Games, with presentations expected to be made later that month. The sports are:

 Cricket (International Cricket Council)
 Break-dancing (World DanceSport Federation)
 Baseball/softball (World Baseball Softball Confederation)
 Flag Football (International Federation of American Football) 
 Lacrosse (World Lacrosse)
 Karate (World Karate Federation)
 Kickboxing (World Association of Kickboxing Organizations)
 Squash (World Squash Federation) 
 Motorsport (Fédération Internationale de l'Automobile)

There is no limit as to the number of sports the IOC can add, but the organizing committee is not obligated to include these sports, and the IOC has set an athlete quota at 10,500 athletes.  

Each sport must also meet the following criteria list for the possibility of inclusion:

 Prioritizing a reduction in the cost and complexity of hosting the Games.
 Engaging the best athletes and sports that put athlete health and safety first.
 Recognizing global appeal to fans across the world, and host country interest.
 Prioritizing gender equality and youth relevance to engage new fans and athletes.
 Upholding integrity and fairness to support clean sports.
 Supporting environmental sustainability to foster long-term sustainability.

A final decision is expected to be made at the 140th IOC Session in Mumbai in 2023.

Ceremonies
In January 2017, it was reported that the bid committee had proposed holding the opening and closing ceremonies at both SoFi Stadium and the historic Los Angeles Memorial Coliseum, in an acknowledgement of its role in the 1932 and 1984 Olympics. The plans called the final leg of the torch relay to be ceremonially launched from the Coliseum, a simulcast of the opening ceremony proper at SoFi Stadium for those in attendance, and the ceremonial re-lighting of the historic Olympic cauldron at the stadium once the cauldron is lit in Inglewood. The closing ceremony would be held in reverse, with opening segments at SoFi Stadium, and the official protocol held at the Coliseum. The proposal is unprecedented and would mark the first time two major venues are featured in the opening and closing ceremonies. The final plan is pending per IOC approval.

Marketing

Emblem
On September 1, 2020, the LA organizing committee unveiled the emblem for the 2028 Summer Olympics, featuring the characters "LA" and "28" in a stacked layout. The "A" in "LA" is designed to be interchangeable, with variations created in collaboration with athletes, artists, designers, celebrities, and other figures (such as musician Billie Eilish, Indian-Canadian comedian Lilly Singh, and actress Reese Witherspoon). There is also a variation derived from the "Stars in Motion" emblem of the 1984 Summer Olympics.

Organizing committee chairman Casey Wasserman explained that the multitude of variations was intended to "showcase our community's collective creativity and celebrate the diversity that makes us strong", as the city "defies a singular identity". Chief marketing officer Amy Gleeson stated that the emblem was designed to "foster a deeper connection with the audience who will be in their 20s and 30s when the games happen."

Broadcasting rights
In the United States, the Games will be broadcast by NBCUniversal, as part of a long-term contract with the IOC through 2032. The Universal Studios Lot is planned to be the site of the International Broadcast Centre for the Games. In addition, NBCUniversal and the organizing committee will coordinate numerous sponsorship sales for the Games, and parent company Comcast will be promoted as a founding partner of Los Angeles 2028 as part of a renewed sponsorship agreement with the United States Olympic & Paralympic Committee (USOPC).

On January 16, 2023, the IOC renewed its European pay television and streaming rights agreements with Warner Bros. Discovery through 2032, covering 49 European territories. The IOC concurrently reached a deal for free-to-air coverage with the European Broadcasting Union (EBU), whose member broadcasters will carry at least 200 hours of coverage of the 2028 Summer Olympics.

Albania – RTSH
Australia – Nine Network
Austria – ORF
Belgium – RTBF, VRT
Brazil – Grupo Globo
Bulgaria – BNT
Canada – CBC/Radio Canada
China – CMG
Croatia – HRT
Czech Republic – ČT
Denmark – DR, TV 2
Europe – EBU, Warner Bros. Discovery
Estonia – ERR
Finland – Yle
France – France Télévisions
Germany – ARD, ZDF
Greece – ERT
Hungary – MTVA
Iceland – RÚV
Ireland – RTÉ
 Israel – Sports Channel
Italy – RAI
Japan – Japan Consortium
Latvia – LTV
Lithuania – LRT
Montenegro – RTCG
Netherlands – NOS
Norway – NRK
Poland – TVP
Slovakia – RTVS
Slovenia – RTV
Spain – RTVE
Sweden – SVT
Switzerland – SRG SSR
Korea – JTBC
Ukraine – Suspilne
United Kingdom – BBC
United States – NBCUniversal

See also

Casey Wasserman – head of the Organizing Committee

References

External links

LA 2028

Candidature files
 Stage 1: Vision, Games Concept and Strategy
 Stage 2: Governance, Legal and Venue Funding
 Budget released Dec. 2nd, 2016
 Stage 3: Games Delivery, Experience, and Venue Legacy
 Sustainability Vision

 
Summer Olympics
Summer Olympics
Summer Olympics in Los Angeles
Summer Olympics 2028
Sports competitions in Los Angeles
Summer Olympics by year